The Royal Physical Society of Edinburgh was a learned society based in Edinburgh, Scotland "for the cultivation of the physical sciences".

The society was founded in 1771 as the Physico-Chirurgical Society but soon after changed its name to the Physical Society. After being granted a Royal Charter in 1778 it became the Royal Physical Society of Edinburgh.

It absorbed a number of other societies over the next fifty years, including the Edinburgh Medico-Chirurgical Society in 1782 (not to be confused with the extant Medico-Chirurgical Society of Edinburgh, founded in 1821), the American Physical Society in 1796 (not to be confused with the extant American Physical Society, founded in 1899), the Hibernian Medical Society in 1799, the Chemical Society in 1803, the Natural History Society in 1812 and the Didactic Society in 1813.

The society occupied a lecture hall in Nicholson Street, Edinburgh, complete with library. From 1854 to 1965, it published the journal Proceedings of the Royal Physical Society of Edinburgh, devoted to articles on experimental biology and natural history.

Members of the society were known as Fellows and permitted to use the post-nominal letters FRPSE. Presidents were elected at intervals, sometimes more than one for each year.

Some of the records of the Society, for the period 1828–1884, are maintained by the Royal Scottish Geographical Society.

Presidents of the Society

1776–77 John Grieve
1813 John Roche
18nn Henry von Heydeloff
1828 Richard Tuite
c.1837 William B. Carpenter
1840 Edward Forbes
1846–48 Robert Halliday Gunning
1851–54 Hugh Miller
1856 Robert Chambers
1858–59 Andrew Murray
1858–59 Professor Balfour
1861–64 James McBain
1861 William Rhind
1862 Thomas Strethill Wright
1863 Alexander Bryson
1863–66 Sir William Turner
1864 David Page
1865–68 Stevenson Macadam
1866–68 John Duns
1870–73 Robert Brown 
1874–77 David Grieve
1876 John Alexander Smith
1876–79 Ramsay Heatley Traquair
1880 John Duns
1881–84 Ramsay Heatley Traquair
1885–88 Sir William Turner
1888–91 Ramsay Heatley Traquair
1895 John Struthers
1906–09 John Graham Kerr
1909?–1912 J Arthur Thomson
1912–15 Orlando Charnock Bradley
1916 Professor Arthur Robinson
1918–21 James Hartley Ashworth
1921–24 Professor D'Arcy Wentworth Thompson
1933–36 Charles Henry O'Donoghue

References

Defunct learned societies of the United Kingdom
Organisations based in Edinburgh
Organisations based in Edinburgh with royal patronage
History of science and technology in Scotland
Defunct organisations based in Scotland
1771 establishments in Scotland
Libraries in Edinburgh
Biology organizations
Organizations disestablished in 1965
1965 disestablishments in Scotland
Physics societies
Zoological societies